Artisteer is a WYSIWYG website theme creation tool developed by Extensoft. The software automatically creates Web templates, including a "Suggest Design" button, which will randomly generates Web design and displays the design preview. The user can adjust the design, and export it as Web template in XHTML, CSS format, or WordPress theme according to their needs.

The first version of the software was released in September 2008. Artisteer version 3.0 was released in June 2011. The current version available is Artisteer 4.3 which was released in August the 27th 2014 for Windows. In June 2021 more than 80,000 sites used Artisteer.

Overview 
Since its main feature is being an automated WYSIWYG editor, Artisteer hides the details of pages HTML code from the user, intended to make it easier for non-coders to create web templates and blog themes. The application can also create tableless layouts. The new created code complies with W3C standards, and generated themes are compatible with most browsers.

Artisteer does not create fully functional Web sites, but instead it provides Web templates which are to be both manually integrated with Web applications and applied to a CMS system. Artisteer also provides an option to export WordPress themes.

The software can also assemble a usable Web template from random elements without user intervention. The user selects the automation feature by the "Suggest Design" option, and they can review the suggested random design.

Due to Artisteers unsolvable constraints such as outdated non-scalable designs, the product was officially replaced by Nicepage in 2018.

Version history

See also
 Web design
 iWeb

References

External links
Artisteer Official site
Dutch Artisteer site

Automated WYSIWYG editors
Web development software
Graphics software
Proprietary software
Computer-related introductions in 2008
Template generators